WWRR is a classic hits radio station in Scranton, Pennsylvania, United States, known as The River, 105 and 103-5.

WWRR programming is simulcast on co-owned WYCK (1340 AM), licensed to nearby Plains, as well as WYCK’s translators W264CG (100.7 FM) Wilkes-Barre and W285FT (104.9 FM) Hazleton.

The station's logo was featured in a fourth season episode of the NBC sitcom The Office, along with their sister station, WICK.

On April 1, 2018, WWRR began simulcasting on WMMZ 103.5 FM Berwick.

References

External links

WRR
Radio stations established in 1975
Classic hits radio stations in the United States